Jaroslav Holík (born 29. June 1953) is a Czech politician and a former member of the Chamber of Deputies from 2013 to 2021.

Holík is a graduate of the Brno University of Technology and owned a motorcycle repair business. Holík first entered politics as a municipal councilor in Březůvky Municipal Council in the Zlín District for the Communist Party of Bohemia and Moravia. For the 2013 Czech legislative election, he stood as a candidate for Tomio Okamura's Dawn of Direct Democracy party and was elected to the Chamber of Deputies for the Zlín region. In 2015, he joined Okamura's new Freedom and Direct Democracy (SPD) party and became leader of the party in Zlín. He was returned to the Chamber as an MP for the SPD in 2017.

References 

1954 births
Living people
21st-century Czech politicians
Freedom and Direct Democracy MPs
Communist Party of Bohemia and Moravia politicians
Members of the Chamber of Deputies of the Czech Republic (2013–2017)
Members of the Chamber of Deputies of the Czech Republic (2017–2021)
Brno University of Technology alumni